Mohnhaupt is a German surname. Notable people with the surname include:

 Heinz Mohnhaupt (born 1935), German jurist
 Brigitte Mohnhaupt (born 1949), German female militant (terrorist) associated with the second generation of the Red Army Faction

See also
 Mohaupt
 Monhaupt

German-language surnames